

2013–14 Top 3 Standings

Events summary

Standings

References

Overall Men